FPJ's Batang Quiapo is a Philippine television drama action series broadcast by Kapamilya Channel. Directed by Malu L. Sevilla, Darnel Villaflor and Coco Martin, the series stars Martin as the titular character. It is based on the 1986 action-comedy film of the same title starring Fernando Poe Jr. and Maricel Soriano The series premiered on the network's Primetime Bida evening block, Cine Mo!, A2Z Primetime Weeknights, and TV5's Todo Max Primetime Singko, and worldwide via The Filipino Channel and Kapatid Channel on February 13, 2023, replacing Mars Ravelo’s Darna.

The series is also available for streaming via iWantTFC worldwide.

Synopsis
A young man rises to be one of the biggest outlaws in the neighborhood while he navigates his way in life to survive in Quiapo. Hoping to earn the affection of his parents, his feat draws him closer to the truth about his identity.

Cast and characters
Main cast
 Coco Martin as Jesus Nazareno  "Tanggol" A. Dimaguiba
 Lovi Poe as Monica "Mokang" Dimaculangan
 Christopher de Leon as Ramon Montenegro
 Coco Martin as young Ramon
 Cherry Pie Picache as Ma. Teresa "Marites" Asuncion-Dimaguiba
 Miles Ocampo as young Marites
 Charo Santos as Matilde "Tindeng" Asuncion 
 Precious Lara Quigaman as young Tindeng
 Lito Lapid as Supremo
 Tommy Abuel as Don Julio Montenegro 
 Raul Montesa as young Don Julio
 Irma Adlawan as Olga Montenegro
 Ryza Cenon as young Olga
 RK Bagatsing as Greg Montenegro
 John Estrada as PO1 Rigor Dimaguiba
 Ejay Falcon as young Rigor

Supporting cast
 McCoy de Leon as David A. Dimaguiba
 Ronwaldo Martin as Santino A. Dimaguiba
 Lou Veloso as Ricardo "Noy" Asuncion, Jr.
 Karl Medina as young Noy
 Pen Medina as Marciano "Marsing" Dimaculangan
 Susan Africa as Nonita "Nita" Dimaculangan
 Ping Medina as Edwin Dimaculangan
 Rez Cortez as Abdul
 Sarah Jane Edwards as Fatima
 Mark "Big Mak" Andaya as Tanos
 Renz Joshua "Baby Giant" Baña as Oweng
 Sugar Ray "Mammoth" Estroso as Bulldog
 Jojit Lorenzo as Enteng
 Ronnie Lazaro as Lucio
 Mark Lapid as Ben
 Benzon Dalina as Turko
 Allan Paule as PO1 Armando "Mando" Mendoza
 Marlo Mortel as young Mando
 Mercedes Cabral as PO2 Lena Cortez
 King Gutierrez as Police Lt. Col. Manuel Suarez
 Dindo Arroyo as Severino
 Ryan Martin as Dolfo 
 Toni Fowler as Chicky
 Lovely Jimenez-Dela Peña as Joy
 Norvin Dela Peña as Norman
 Jeolanie Aporado Sacdalan as Chairman
 Elyson "Ghost Wrecker" Caranza as Tanod/Kagawad
 Aaron "Yorme" Sunga as Tolits
 Erin Espiritu as Tala
 Derick Hubalde as Brando
 Gela Atayde as Vanessa Dimaguiba
 Rani Caldoza as Mr. Valentin
 Julio Diaz as Delfin 
 Robbie Packing as Ato
 Ivan Carapiet as Diego
 Joel Lamangan as Roda
 Anghel Marcial
 Ghersie Fantastico
 Marlon Tourette
Guest cast
 Rey Langit as Ruben
 Jun Hidalgo as Omar
 Dino Imperial as JP
 Paolo Serrano as Paquito
 Jimboy Martin as Karlo
 Marie Preizer as Sarah
 Sophie Reyes as Jill
 Drey Brown as Tony
 Yuki Takahashi as Camille
 Myrna Castillo as Myrna
 Bryan "Smugglaz" Lao as Kidlat
 Lordivino "Bassilyo" Ignacio as Teban
 Raymond Buensuceso "Flict-G" Rivera
 Boss "Barakojuan" John
 Bullet "Boss Bullet" Manliclic
 Antonio "Mastafeat" Cajuban Jr.
 Jonas Dichoso
 Romarico "Crazymix" Superable
 Marco "Kial" Alkadama
 Christian Carlo "Pistolero" Cañares

Episodes
<onlyinclude>

Production 
After the success of the television adaptation of Ang Probinsyano, Batang Quiapo was pegged by various news outlets as Martin's likeliest next project and a possible new TV series. Rumors of the possible TV adaptation of Batang Quiapo began when the film's theme, Doon Lang, was performed by Martin in a "duet" with Fernando Poe Jr. as the clip of the scene from the film was being played; said scene originally featured Poe and Maricel Soriano singing in a duet. Martin had expressed interest in adapting more of FPJ's works for film and/or television, as he adapted another Poe classic Carlo J. Caparas' Ang Panday which was an entry into the 2017 Metro Manila Film Festival.

However, the adaptation became uncertain due to Ang Probinsyano'''s continued extension until its finale on August 12, 2022.

On December 5, 2022, Martin is confirmed to star, direct, write, and to co-produce (the first in his showbiz career) in the Batang Quiapo remake alongside Poe's daughter, Lovi Poe and Charo Santos.

Principal photography commenced on January 9, 2023, the same day of the celebration of the Feast of the Black Nazarene.

Original soundtrack
The original soundtrack of the series is composed of the song "Batang Quiapo" performed by various local rappers, and a cover of Rico J. Puno's "Kapalaran" sung by Gary Valenciano.

ReceptionBatang Quiapo was a success upon its debut. The pilot week has generated over 44 million digital views across all online platforms and peaked with 341,509 live concurrent viewers on YouTube. The official tag also became the No. 1 trending topic on Twitter nationwide.

RatingsBatang Quiapo ruled its timeslot upon its premiere on February 13, 2023. According to Kantar Media, the pilot episode rated a 21.4% and rose to 22.6% on February 15 (beating its rival Maria Clara at Ibarra with 19.1% and 19.6% respectively).

Despite limited reach on free-to-air, AGB Nielsen Philippines reported that the pilot week of the series gave a positive feedback on the viewers with 12.5% pilot episode rating on February 13, 2023, placing it in the 3rd spot of the rating board and 13.8% rating on February 15, placing on the 2nd spot of the rating board (compared to Maria Clara at Ibarra's 12.5%).

Muslim stereotype controversy
A day after its debut, the series' creators apologized to the Muslim community due to a scene where Martin's character Tanggol sought the help of his Muslim friend Abdul–portrayed by Rez Cortez–as he was being pursued by the police. Tanggol took refuge in the company of armed Muslim men whom the police were hesitant to take action due to fear of retribution. A number of Muslim Filipinos took offense and criticised the portrayal as reinforcing negative stereotypes against them, with some calling for a boycott of the series. MTRCB later released a statement on the said controversy. Senator Robin Padilla–a prominent Filipino Muslim–also issued a statement regarding the episode, assuring people that Martin did not have any "ill intentions" and appealed to fellow Filipino Muslims for understanding and forgiveness.

Notes

See alsoBatang Quiapo''
List of programs broadcast by Kapamilya Channel
List of programs broadcast by Kapamilya Online Live
List of programs broadcast by A2Z (Philippine TV channel)
List of programs broadcast by TV5 (Philippine TV network)
List of programs broadcast by ABS-CBN
List of programs broadcast by Jeepney TV
List of ABS-CBN original drama series

References

External links

2020s Philippine television series
2023 Philippine television series debuts
2020s crime television series
Bank robbery in fiction
Gangs in fiction
Islam-related controversies in Asia
Live action television shows based on films
Philippine action television series
Philippine comedy-drama television series
Philippine crime television series
Robbery in television
Television controversies in the Philippines
Television series about organized crime
Television series about orphans
Television shows set in Manila
Theft in fiction